Route 162, or Highway 162, may refer to:

Canada
  Nova Scotia Highway 162
Prince Edward Island Route 162
  Quebec Route 162

India
 National Highway 162 (India)

Ireland
 R162 road (Ireland)

Japan
 Japan National Route 162

United States
 Alabama State Route 162
 Arkansas Highway 162
 California State Route 162
 Connecticut Route 162
 Georgia State Route 162
 Idaho State Highway 162
 Illinois Route 162
 Indiana State Road 162
 Kentucky Route 162
 Louisiana Highway 162
 Maine State Route 162
 Maryland Route 162
 M-162 (Michigan highway)
 Missouri Route 162
 Nevada State Route 162
 New Jersey Route 162
 New Mexico State Road 162
 New York State Route 162
 North Carolina Highway 162
 Ohio State Route 162
 Oklahoma State Highway 162
 Pennsylvania Route 162
 South Carolina Highway 162
 Tennessee State Route 162
 Texas State Highway 162 (former)
 Texas State Highway Spur 162
 Farm to Market Road 162
 Utah State Route 162
 Virginia State Route 162
 Washington State Route 162
 Wisconsin Highway 162
Territories
 Puerto Rico Highway 162